Violin spider can refer to:

Recluse spider, also known as violin spiders
Drymusa, false violin spiders

Animal common name disambiguation pages